Günther Happich (28 January 1952 – 16 October 1995) was an Austrian football midfielder who played for Austria in the 1978 FIFA World Cup. He also played for Wiener Sport-Club, SK Rapid Wien, and First Vienna FC.

References

1952 births
1995 deaths
Austrian footballers
Austria international footballers
Association football midfielders
Austrian Football Bundesliga players
Wiener Sport-Club players
SK Rapid Wien players
First Vienna FC players
1978 FIFA World Cup players
Footballers from Vienna